War wagon is an ancient Chinese, medieval Korean, or Czech siege weapon.

War wagon may also refer to:

 The War Wagon, a 1967 western film starring John Wayne and Kirk Douglas
 Hwacha, a Korean weapon which employs gunpowder and projectiles
 A carroccio or carro della guerra, a four-wheeled war altar used by the medieval republics of Italy
 War Wagon, in comics, a fictional weapon used unsuccessfully against the Hulk; see Betty Ross